Dimo Atanasov (born 24 October 1985, in Pavlikeni) is a Bulgarian footballer who plays as a defender or midfielder.

Career
In June 2003, Atanasov joined Lokomotiv Sofia on a four-year contract for an undisclosed fee. On 12 November 2003, he made his Lokomotiv debut in a 3–0 victory against Sliven 2000 in the Bulgarian Cup Third Round, coming on as a substitute for Radoslav Ivanov. Atanasov spent 7 seasons of his career at the club of Sofia, playing in 142 games and scoring 14 goals in A PFG.

On 24 January 2011, it was announced that Atanasov had signed with Ludogorets Razgrad on a -year contract.

In February 2017, Atanasov joined Etar Veliko Tarnovo.

International career
Atanasov also played for the Bulgaria national under-21 football team and scored 2 goals – one in a friendly game against Republic of Macedonia and one in a qualification against Ukraine.

Career statistics
As of 15 May 2011

References

External links
 Atanasov Profile at Soccerway

1985 births
Living people
Bulgarian footballers
Bulgaria under-21 international footballers
First Professional Football League (Bulgaria) players
FC Lokomotiv 1929 Sofia players
PFC Ludogorets Razgrad players
Botev Plovdiv players
PFC Lokomotiv Plovdiv players
PFC Slavia Sofia players
PFC Cherno More Varna players
PFC Marek Dupnitsa players
FC Vereya players
PFC Spartak Pleven players
FC Lokomotiv Gorna Oryahovitsa players
SFC Etar Veliko Tarnovo players
FC CSKA 1948 Sofia players
Association football midfielders
People from Pavlikeni
Sportspeople from Veliko Tarnovo Province